Prehistoric beast may refer to:

 Prehistoric Beast, a ten-minute experimental animated film by Phil Tippett
 Any animal alive during prehistory, the time period before recorded history
 In particular, prehistoric megafauna, such as mammoths or dinosaurs

See also
 Beast (disambiguation)
 Monster, a type of grotesque creature